The citizens' income is a social welfare system created in Italy in January 2019. Although its name recalls one of a universal basic income, this provision is actually a form of conditional and non-individual guaranteed minimum income.

The citizens' income was proposed by the Five Star Movement (M5S) and was approved under the Conte I Cabinet. According to research from Italy's National Institute of Statistics, there are "one million fewer poor people thanks to the citizen' income" and was useful in reducing excess poverty especially during the COVID-19 pandemic in Italy and the subsequent COVID-19 recession. Poverty in Italy remains high, as 56% of the poor do not receive the allowance because they have not resided in Italy for at least 10 years, do not turn to the Centre of Fiscal Assistance and patronages, or already have savings.

The citizens' income received attention during the campaign for the 2022 Italian general election, as the centre-right coalition wanted to either abolish it or strongly modify it but disagreed among themselves, while the centre-left coalition wanted to reform and improve it, and the M5S defended it from right-wing criticism.

See also 
 Italian welfare state

References 

Economy of Italy
Welfare in Italy